Kematen an der Ybbs is a town in the district of Amstetten in Lower Austria, Austria.

Geography
Kematen an der Ybbs lies in the Mostviertel in Lower Austria on the Ybbs River. About 22 percent of the municipality is forested.

References

Cities and towns in Amstetten District